Mark Ozer (born 16 June 1964) is an American former professional tennis player.

Ozer, the son of a neurologist, grew up around Washington D.C. and played tennis for Princeton University, while studying for a history degree between 1982 and 1986. 

In 1987 he turned professional and went on to reach a career high singles ranking of 474. Most of his main draw appearances at Grand Prix/ATP Tour level were as a doubles player and he won a Challenger title in doubles at Jerusalem in 1989. He had a best doubles ranking of 155 in the world.

Challenger titles

Doubles: (1)

References

External links
 
 

1964 births
Living people
American male tennis players
Princeton Tigers men's tennis players
Tennis players from Washington, D.C.